BoardVitals is a medical specialty board certification preparation firm which was founded in 2012, offering study material and question banks for physicians, medical students, and others in the health-care industry. The exam provides user feedback on how they compare to their peers overall on a test and how they compared on specific questions. 

BoardVitals is based in New York City and was the winner of the 2014 Gust Catapult NYC venture capital competition for start-ups in the area.  It provided the firm with further venture capital and angel investing opportunities.

Founding
BoardVitals was founded by Dr. Andrea Paul and Dan Lambert in 2012. Dr. Paul is a graduate of Michigan State medical school, and a former resident at Yale medical school and Mt. Sinai Hospital. She has stated that among her motivations for the company was the disorganization she experienced while studying for medical board exams. In an interview with Entrepreneur Magazine, she remembered when she “was preparing for [her] own boards, [she] was putting together things from other books and notes that were not up to date.” She critiqued the lack of any standardized preparation or review and therefore sought to make a dynamic change. Dr. Paul left her Yale residency program to team up with several medical educators.

She partnered with Harvard Business School graduate and software developer Dan Lambert in 2012 to head Board Vitals as its CEO. Lambert was formerly a co-founder and CTO at Pushpins, which was acquired by Ebates in 2013.

Business structure
After its founding in 2012, BoardVitals has undergone several rounds of financing. In January 2014 it received a $500k seed investment from venture capital firms Rothenberg Ventures and Accelerator Blueprint Health.

In February 2014, BoardVitals entered the Gust Catapult NYC startup contest sponsored by entrepreneur and investor David S. Rose. The contest created a platform for startups to pitch their business plan to a series of angel investors and venture capitalists. BoardVitals was selected as the winner of the competition out of over two hundred candidates. It was then invited to spend three months in a Silicon Alley incubator under the tutelage of Rose.  Eventually, BoardVitals has drawn the attention of several major investment groups.

Its clients include Harvard medical school, Yale medical school, and the Veterans Health Administration. In addition, it has partnerships with several medical publishers including McGraw-Hill, Wolters Kluwer Health, and Wiley Publishers. The business model focuses on aggregating questions and answers from Publishers, Universities, and individually contributing physicians in a single location.

Test preparation
Its board review programs are offered to individuals as well as medical schools, residency programs, teaching hospitals, and other medical facilities, both in the United States and abroad. It currently offers test reviews and questions for sixteen specialty fields:
 Cardiology
 Child Psychiatry
 Dermatology
 Echocardiography
 Emergency Medicine
 ENT
 Family Medicine
 Gastroenterology
 Internal Medicine
 Neurology
 OBGYN
 Pathology
 Pediatrics
 Podiatry
 Psychiatry
 Radiology
 Surgery

Each exam and question offers users feedback on their performance. It indicates where they stand in comparison to their peers, including data about what other users answered on a particular question. The statistics give users an accurate review of their performance in each section. User can customize practice tests to suit their exact needs, with advanced statistics available to offer premier test review. Board Vitals has given a guarantee that users will pass their board review.

Dr. Paul has stated the company plans to expand this to many more fields in the coming years.

Reception
Dr. Paul was named among the top ten disruptive women in healthcare startups. Gust.com named Board Vitals the 'Most Promising' startup in New York. The company has been featured in business profiles by several newspapers including CNN, Forbes, and Fox News.

References

Test preparation companies
Medical education in the United States
Educational institutions established in 2012
2012 establishments in New York City